Srungavaram is a village in Rowthulapudi Mandal, Kakinada district in the state of Andhra Pradesh in India.

Geography 

Demographics 
Srungavaram Village has a population of 3,774, out of which 1886 are male and 1888 are female. Population of children below 6 years of age are 462. The literacy rate of the village is 48.52%.

References 

Villages in Rowthulapudi mandal